The Aguadilla–Isabela–San Sebastián metropolitan area is a United States Census Bureau defined metropolitan statistical area (MSA) in northwestern Puerto Rico. According to the 2009 Census Bureau estimate, The area has the total population at 342,495, a 9.56% increase over the 2000 census figure of 312,602.

Aguadilla–Isabela–San Sebastián is the second-largest metropolitan area (by population) in Puerto Rico after San Juan–Caguas–Guaynabo and is the fastest growing MSA in the Commonwealth.

This metropolitan area is known for its beaches and attracts surfers and tourists. Rincón is particularly famous for this reason. Aguadilla has one of the primary airports on the island. Its history is rich because it is believed Columbus landed around this area and the Grito de Lares revolution started here.

Municipalities
A total of eight municipalities are included as part of the Aguadilla-Isabela-San Sebastián Metropolitan Statistical Area.

Aguadilla (Principal city) Pop: 55,101
Isabela (Principal city) Pop: 42,943
San Sebastián (Principal city) Pop: 39,345
Aguada Pop: 38,136
Moca Pop: 37,460
Lares Pop: 28,015
Añasco Pop: 25,596
Rincón Pop: 15,187

Gallery

See also
Puerto Rico census statistical areas

References

 
Metropolitan areas of Puerto Rico